Tuaiwa Hautai "Eva" Rickard (née Kereopa; 19 April 1925 – 6 December 1997) rose to prominence as an activist for Māori land rights and for women’s rights within Māoridom. She was born in Raglan. Her methods included public civil disobedience and she is best known for leading the occupation of the Raglan golf course in the 1970s.

Biography
Eva Rickard was most notably regarded for her decade long, very public civil disobedience campaigns to have ancestral lands alongside Raglan harbour returned to the local tribes and Māori mana (power, effectiveness) and culture recognized. During the Second World War, the New Zealand Government took land from indigenous Māori owners by acquisition for the purpose of a military airfield. The land was not returned to the Tainui Awhiro peoples following the war; instead, a  block was turned into a public Raglan golf course in 1969.

Throughout the 1970s Rickard campaigned to raise public awareness about Māori land rights. After attempting to reoccupy this ancestral indigenous land in 1978, she was arrested for trespass along with another 19 Māori protesters on the ninth hole of the Raglan golf course. This incident was captured by New Zealand television. Their court appearances led to the return of the indigenous land. After the land was returned, it became a focus for local job-training and employment programs, as well as a focus for the Māori sovereignty movement.

The Mana Māori Movement was the largest wholly Māori political party, founded by Rickard, and contested the 2002 New Zealand general election. Mana Māori incorporated the smaller Te Tawharau and Piri Wiri Tua parties. Rickard was originally a member of Mana Motuhake, another Māori party, but quit when Mana Motuhake joined the Alliance (a broad left-wing coalition).

Rickard was an ardent advocate for women’s rights within Māoridom and encouraged other female activists to ignore traditional Māori protocol by calling for Māori women to speak at official Māori gatherings, including on the marae. At her official tangi (funeral) where she was interred on the land she had spent a decade fighting to have returned to her people, Māori activist Annette Sykes when attempting to speak, had to endure cries of "you sit down, you have no right to speak." Here Annette Sykes stood up and publicly challenged men to recognise the mana of Māori women.

See also
 Māori Party
 Angeline Greensill
 Raglan
 Tainui
 Māori protest movement
 Bastion Point
 Land rights
 Protest

References

Other sources
Obituary in New Zealand Herald of 9 December 1997 page A16
Eva Rickard and other Māori activists on Radio New Zealand's Treaty of Waitangi- Te Tiriti o Waitangi Focus program, describing their long campaigns for Māori land rights and self-determination.
Eva Rickards' letter to the Queen of the United Kingdom, 13 September 1995.

External links
 If Christ came to Raglan
 Rickard on Māori women
 Revolutionary Women Stencils
 Rickard biography
 Marae Protocol and Gender
 Official Treaty of Waitangi Information Site

Leaders of political parties in New Zealand
People from Raglan, New Zealand
1925 births
1997 deaths
New Zealand women activists
Māori activists
New Zealand Māori feminists
1978 in New Zealand
Mana Māori Movement politicians
Mana Motuhake politicians
Unsuccessful candidates in the 1990 New Zealand general election
Unsuccessful candidates in the 1987 New Zealand general election
Unsuccessful candidates in the 1981 New Zealand general election